The Lady Franklin Bay Expedition of 1881–1884 to Lady Franklin Bay on Ellesmere Island in the Canadian Arctic was led by Lieutenant Adolphus Greely, and was promoted by the United States Army Signal Corps. Its purpose was to establish a meteorological-observation station as part of the First International Polar Year, and to collect astronomical and magnetic data. During the expedition, two members of the crew reached a new Farthest North record, but of the original twenty-five men, only seven survived to return.

The expedition was under the auspices of the Signal Corps at a time when the Corps' Chief Disbursements officer, Henry W. Howgate, was arrested for embezzlement. However, that did not deter the planning and execution of the voyage.

Expedition

First year, 1881 

The Lady Franklin Bay Expedition was led by Lieutenant Adolphus W. Greely of the Fifth United States Cavalry, with astronomer Edward Israel and photographer George W. Rice among the crew of twenty-one officers and men. They sailed on the ship Proteus and reached St. John's, Newfoundland, in early July 1881. At Godhavn, Greenland, they picked up Jens Edward and Thorlip Frederik Christiansen, two Inuit dogsled drivers, as well as physician Octave Pierre Pavy and Mr. Clay who had continued scientific studies instead of returning on Florence with the remainder of the 1880 Howgate Expedition.

Proteus arrived without problems at Lady Franklin Bay by August 11, dropped off men and provisions, and left. Unbeknownst to Greely, the summer had been extraordinarily warm, which led to an underestimation of the difficulties which their relief expeditions would face in reaching Lady Franklin Bay in subsequent years.

Second year, 1882 
By summer of 1882, the men were expecting a supply ship from the south. Neptune, laden with relief supplies, set out in July 1882 but, cut off by ice and weather, Captain Beebe was forced to turn around prematurely. All he could do was leave some supplies at Smith Sound in August, and the remaining provisions in Newfoundland, with plans for their delivery the following year.

On July 20, Pavy's contract ended, and Pavy announced that he would not renew it, but would continue to attend to the expedition's medical needs. Greely was incensed, and ordered the doctor to turn over all his records and journals. Pavy refused, and Greely placed him under arrest. Pavy was not confined, however Greely claimed he intended to court-martial him when they returned to the United States.

Third year, 1883 
In 1883, new rescue attempts by Proteus, commanded by Lieutenant Ernest Albert Garlington, and Yantic, commanded by Commander Frank Wildes, failed, with Proteus being crushed by pack ice.

In the summer of 1883, in accordance with his instructions for the case of two consecutive relief expeditions not reaching Fort Conger, Greely decided to head South with his crew. It had been planned that the relief ships should depot supplies along the Nares Strait, around Cape Sabine and at Littleton Island, if they were unable to reach Fort Conger, which should have made for a comfortable wintering of Greely's men. But with Neptune not even getting that far and Proteus sunk, in reality only a small emergency cache with 40 days worth of supplies had been laid at Cape Sabine by Proteus.

When arriving there in October 1883, the season was too advanced for Greely to either try to brave the Baffin Bay to reach Greenland with his small boats, or to retire to Fort Conger, so he had to winter on the spot.

Fourth year, 1884 
In 1884, Secretary of the Navy, William E. Chandler, was credited with planning the ensuing rescue effort, commanded by Cdr. Winfield Scott Schley. While four vessels—, and Loch Garry—made it to Greely's camp on June 22, only seven men had survived the winter. The rest had succumbed to starvation, hypothermia, and drowning, and one man, Private Henry, had been shot on Greely's order for repeated theft of food rations. Of the seven rescued, Joseph Elison died on July 8th following multiple amputations. The relief party arrived at St. John's, Newfoundland on July 17, 1884 from which the news was telegraphed throughout the States, and a sketched portrait of the members of the Greely Expedition, both living and dead, was published. After a stay of ten days the ships left for New York.

The surviving members of the expedition were received as heroes. A parade attended by thousands was held in Portsmouth, New Hampshire. It was decided that each of the survivors was to be awarded a promotion in rank by the Army, although Greely reportedly refused.

Controversy 
Rumors of cannibalism arose following the return of the corpses. On August 14, 1884, a few days after his funeral, the body of Lieutenant Frederick Kislingbury, second in command of the expedition, was exhumed and an autopsy was performed. The finding that flesh had been cut from the bones appeared to confirm the accusation. However, Greely and the surviving crew denied knowledge of cannibalism, and it was surmised some members were trapping sea-lice for food and needed meat for bait.

References

Footnotes

Bibliography

External links 
 
 
 
 Frederick Hadley Journal, Surgeon on the Neptune at Dartmouth College Library
 Charles S. McClain diary excerpts at Dartmouth College Library
 P.W. Johnson Diary at Dartmouth College Library
 PBS: Abandoned in the Arctic

19th century in the Arctic
1881 in Canada
1882 in Canada
1883 in Canada
1884 in Canada
Arctic expeditions
Incidents of cannibalism
North American expeditions